Daniel Thomas Minogue (4 September 1891 – 27 July 1961) was an Australian rules footballer, who played with three different clubs in the (then) Victorian Football League (VFL), and who was the coach of five different VFL clubs.

Family
The son of Matthew Minogue (1868-1899),  and Ellen Minogue (1868-1896), née Madden, Daniel Thomas Minogue was born at Bendigo on 4 September 1891.

He married Ann Marion Morrison (1893-1968) on 30 March 1921.

Education
He was educated at the Marist Brothers' College, Bendigo.

Football

Collingwood (VFL)
Minogue was considered a courageous, or perhaps reckless, centre half-back. On one occasion he sustained a broken collarbone playing for Collingwood Football Club in the first minute of the 1911 Grand Final and then played out the entire match.

Third Divisional team (AIF)
He was the vice-captain of the (winning) Third Australian Divisional team in the famous "Pioneer Exhibition Game" of Australian Rules football, held in London, in October 1916. A news film was taken at the match.

Richmond (VFL)
Unhappy at Collingwood's treatment of his friend and former teammate, Jim Sadler, during the war, Minogue demanded a transfer to Richmond on his return from AIF service during World War I created ill feeling and he had to stand out of competition for twelve months in order to secure the transfer.

Coach

VFL players' advocate
In August 1947, he was appointed as the official VFL players's advocate; a position he held until his death.

Death
He died at the Repatriation General Hospital, in Heidelberg, Victoria, on 27 July 1961.

Hall of fame
In 1996 Minogue was inducted into the Australian Football Hall of Fame.

See also
 1916 Pioneer Exhibition Game

Footnotes

References 

 Pioneer Exhibition Game Australian Football: in aid of British and French Red Cross Societies: 3rd Australian Division v. Australian Training Units at Queen's Club, West Kensington, on Saturday, October 28th, 1916, at 3pm, Wightman & Co., (London), 1919.
 Hogan P: The Tigers Of Old, Richmond FC, (Melbourne), 1996. 
 Minogue, D. & Millard, P.J., "Famous A.I.F. Match in London: Unknown Richmond Lad was the Star", The Sporting Globe, (Saturday, 21 August 1937), p.8.
 Richardson, N. (2016), The Game of Their Lives, Pan Macmillan Australia: Sydney. 
 Ross, J. (ed), 100 Years of Australian Football 1897–1996: The Complete Story of the AFL, All the Big Stories, All the Great Pictures, All the Champions, Every AFL Season Reported, Viking, (Ringwood), 1996. 
 
 Photograph at Daniel Thomas Minogue, at Discovering Anzacs.
 First World War Embarkation Roll: Gunner Daniel Thomas Minogue (24559), collection of the Australian War Memorial.
 First World War Nominal Roll: Gunner Daniel Thomas Minogue (24559), collection of the Australian War Memorial.
 First World War Service Record: Gunner Daniel Thomas Minogue (24559), National Archives of Australia.

External links
 
 Dan Minogue's coaching record, at AFL Tables.
 
 Collingwood Forever Profile
 AFL Hall of Fame

Collingwood Football Club players
Participants in "Pioneer Exhibition Game" (London, 28 October 1916)
Australian Rules footballers: place kick exponents
Hawthorn Football Club players
Richmond Football Club players
Richmond Football Club Premiership players
Richmond Football Club coaches
Richmond Football Club Premiership coaches
Hawthorn Football Club coaches
Carlton Football Club coaches
Fitzroy Football Club coaches
St Kilda Football Club coaches
Australian Football Hall of Fame inductees
1891 births
1961 deaths
Australian rules footballers from Bendigo
Australian military personnel of World War I
Two-time VFL/AFL Premiership players
Two-time VFL/AFL Premiership coaches
Military personnel from Victoria (Australia)